The Palace of Canto del Pico (Spanish: Palacio del Canto del Pico) is a palace located in Torrelodones, Spain. It was declared Private property in 1930.

Construction and location 

The palace was built between 1920 and 1922 for Abárzuza, Conde de las Almenas III. It is located on the peak of a granite mountain, 1,011 metres above sea level. It covers 100 acres. Parts of it remain carved into the rock, such as stairs and balconies.

Initial ownership 

The Count used the palace to store all his treasures. He accumulated these and there are rumours that some many have been stolen from cathedrals.  Financial difficulties forced him to sell the treasures for 2 million pesetas to a US buyer  
The prime minister Antonio Maura died there by falling down a flight of steps.

Civil War usage 

It was used as the headquarters for the Republican Army during the Spanish Civil War. Indalecio Prieto and Jose Miaja used it as their base to organise the Battle of Brunete. After the war Franco lived there for many years.

Recent years 

The palace has suffered heavily from looting and vandalism over the years, and a fire destroyed many of the remaining artworks in 1998.  This led to it receiving a reduced classification in 2004. A hotel company bought it in 1988 intending to convert it into a luxury hotel. Planning permission was refused for the hotel in 2013 due to the building's value as a cultural monument

See also 

 Imperial Route of the Community of Madrid

References 

Palaces in the Community of Madrid
Bien de Interés Cultural landmarks in the Community of Madrid
Houses completed in 1922